Cicuiara is a genus of longhorn beetles of the subfamily Lamiinae, containing the following species:

 Cicuiara nitidula (Bates, 1866)
 Cicuiara striata (Bates, 1866)

References

Desmiphorini